The list of ship launches in 1845 includes a chronological list of some ships launched in 1845.


References

Sources

1845
Ship launches